MacGovern is a surname. Notable people with the surname include:
 John MacGovern (born 1951), American politician
 Stan MacGovern (1903-1975), American cartoonist

See also
 McGovern (disambiguation)